Douglas Arthur Wimbish (born September 22, 1956) is an American bass player, primarily known for being a member of rock band Living Colour and funk/dub/hip hop collective Tackhead, and as a session musician with artists such as Sugarhill Gang, Grandmaster Flash and the Furious Five, The Rolling Stones, Mick Jagger, Depeche Mode, James Brown, Annie Lennox, and Barrington Levy (as well as his studio work for the rap/hip hop label Sugarhill Records and the experimental dub label On-U Sound).

Biography and career

Born in Hartford, Connecticut, Wimbish started playing guitar at the age of 12 and switched to bass guitar at the age of 14. In 1979 he was hired together with guitarist Skip McDonald and drummer Keith LeBlanc to form the house rhythm section for Sugarhill Records. Although they did not play on the Sugarhill Gang's famous song "Rapper's Delight" (the rhythm tracks for this song were played by the group Positive Force), they did play on many other popular song tracks, including "The Message" by Grandmaster Flash and the Furious Five, "White Lines" by Grandmaster Flash and Melle Mel, "New York City" by Grandmaster Flash and the Furious Five, and "Apache" by the Sugarhill Gang. 

Together with McDonald and LeBlanc, Wimbish headed to London in 1984 and started working with producer Adrian Sherwood and formed the group Tackhead. Together with Tackhead and as a session bassist, Wimbish found himself in demand as a bass player for many artists and was considered as a permanent sideman for the Rolling Stones after the departure of bassist Bill Wyman in 1993, but lost the position to Darryl Jones. In the late 1980s Wimbish began crossing paths with vocalist Bernard Fowler, who collaborated with Tackhead and Little Axe. Both sang on records by the Rolling Stones, and Wimbish later played on the Stones' 1997 album Bridges to Babylon. Wimbish joined Living Colour in 1992 (he replaced Muzz Skillings, who left the band) to tour and record the album, Stain.

Living Colour disbanded in 1995, and Wimbish joined his old Sugarhill Gang partners to play in Little Axe, an ambient-dub project initiated by Skip 'Little Axe' MacDonald.

After Living Colour disbanded, Wimbish went back to London to continue his career as a studio bassist. In 1999 he formed the drum and bass group Jungle Funk together with drummer Will Calhoun and percussionist/vocalist Vinx. Also in 1999, Wimbish solo album Trippy Notes for Bass was released. In 2000, Living Colour was re-formed and toured in the United States, South America and Europe.  In 2001 and 2002 Wimbish recorded and played with rapper Mos Def in a band called BlackJack Johnson, which also featured members of P-Funk and Bad Brains in the lineup.

Wimbish also formed Head Fake, a drum and bass project with drummer Will Calhoun. They released a CD, In The Area. In 2005 they started recording new songs. The recording took place in Brussels, Belgium and was followed by an extensive European tour. The CD has never been released. A Head>>Fake DVD was released in 2008. It features a recording of a Head>>Fake concert in Prague.

In 2008 Wimbish, signed with Enja Records, and released his second solo album, CinemaSonics.

In 2009, Living Colour released and toured for the album "The Chair in the Doorway".

Wimbish was also featured on six Little Axe albums with Alan Glen on harmonica.

Gear
Wimbish has endorsed Ibanez and Spector bass guitars.

Discography

Solo albums
 Trippy Notes for Bass (1999)
 CinemaSonics (2008)

With Madonna
 Erotica (Warner Bros. Records, 1992)

With Mick Jagger
 Primitive Cool (Columbia Records, 1987)
 Wandering Spirit (Atlantic Records, 1993)

With Candi Staton
 Nightlites (Sugar Hill Records, 1982)

With Gary Go
 Gary Go (Decca Records, 2009)

With Steven Van Zandt
 Freedom – No Compromise (EMI, 1987)

With Carly Simon
 Spoiled Girl (Epic Records, 1985)
 Letters Never Sent (Arista Records, 1994)

With Melba Moore
 I'm in Love (Capitol Records, 1988)

With Joe Satriani
 The Extremist (Relativity Records, 1992)
 Time Machine (Relativity Records, 1993)

With Billy Idol
 Cyberpunk (Chrysalis Records, 1993)

With Nicole Renée
 Nicole Renée (Atlantic Records, 1998)

With Ronnie Wood
 Slide on This (Continuum Records, 1992)

With Depeche Mode
 Ultra (Mute, 1997)

With Nona Hendryx
 The Heat (RCA Records, 1985)

With Sheena Easton
 No Sound But a Heart (EMI, 1987)

With Chris Catena
 Freak Out! (Frontiers, 2003)

With Bernard Fowler
 Friends With Privileges (Sony, 2006)
 The Bura (MRI, 2016)

With Al Green
 Don't Look Back (BMG, 1993)
 Your Heart's in Good Hands (MCA Records, 1995)

With Annie Lennox
 Diva (Arista Records, 1992)
 Medusa (Arista Records, 1995)

With Michael Bolton
 The Hunger (Columbia Records, 1987)

With Naomi Campbell
 Baby Woman (Epic Records, 1994)

References

External links

1956 births
Musicians from Hartford, Connecticut
American session musicians
Living people
African-American rock musicians
American heavy metal bass guitarists
American funk bass guitarists
American male bass guitarists
Living Colour members
Tackhead members
Alternative metal bass guitarists
Guitarists from Connecticut
American male guitarists
20th-century American guitarists
Fats Comet members
African-American guitarists